Hubei Guangbo Wang, which translates as the Hubei Broadcasting Network, consists of a group of radio stations serving the greater Hubei Province area.

List of Hubei Guangbo Wang Radio Stations

External links
 

Chinese-language radio stations
Mandarin-language radio stations
Radio stations in China
Mass media in Hubei